
Gmina Raciążek is a rural gmina (administrative district) in Aleksandrów County, Kuyavian-Pomeranian Voivodeship, in north-central Poland.

Villages
Gmina Raciążek contains the villages and settlements of Dąbrówka Duża, Niestuszewo, Podole, Podzamcze, Raciążek, Siarzewo, Turzno and Turzynek.

Neighbouring gminas
Gmina Raciążek is bordered by the towns of Ciechocinek and Nieszawa, and by the gminas of Aleksandrów Kujawski, Czernikowo, Koneck and Waganiec.

References
Polish official population figures 2006

Raciazek
Aleksandrów County